(22 September 1878 – 20 October 1967) was a Japanese diplomat and politician who served as prime minister of Japan from 1946 to 1947 and from 1948 to 1954. Yoshida was one of the longest-serving Japanese prime ministers, and is the third-longest serving prime minister of post-occupation Japan.

Early life and education

Yoshida was born on 22 September 1878, in Kanda-Surugadai, Tokyo, the fifth son of political activist and former samurai Tsuna Takeuchi. Tsuna was a devout supporter of Itagaki Taisuke and would later serve in the first National Diet in 1890. Yoshida's biological mother's identity is not known. Shortly before his birth, his biological father was arrested for anti-government conspiracy, and his mother gave birth to him at the house of Kenzō Yoshida, a friend of his father. As young samurai, Tsuna and Kenzō had made a name amidst the decades of unrest around the time of Meiji Restoration. In August 1881, Yoshida was adopted by Kenzō Yoshida and his wife Kotoko. Kenzō was a wealthy trade merchant, former Jardine Matheson Yokohama branch manager and former samurai, and Kotoko was the daughter of an Edo period Confucian scholar.

Yoshida began his education in a rural boarding school. He graduated elementary school in 1889. That same year, Kenzō Yoshida died, and Shigeru inherited a substantial fortune from him. Kotoko subsequently raised Shigeru on the family's estate in Ōiso. Shigeru finished secondary school in 1894, and attended junior high school until 1895, after which he briefly attended business school. He attended an academy run by the crown prince's ethics tutor in Tokyo, and briefly studied at Keio University and the Tokyo Physics School (now the Tokyo University of Science). He also spent a year ill at home in Ōiso. In 1897, he entered the prestigious Peers' School, which prepared members of the elite for the public service, and was run by Duke Konoe Atsumaro. After completing his education there, Yoshida attended a college for diplomats also run by Duke Atsumaro. Shortly after Atsumaro's death in 1904, the college became defunct, and Yoshida then studied law at Tokyo Imperial University, graduating with a law degree in 1906. He passed the Foreign Service Entry Exam and entered Japan's diplomatic corps that same year, shortly after Japan's victory against Russia in the Russo-Japanese War. He has long been regarded as prioritising the economy over defense, but recent years have seen a reevaluation of this viewpoint.

Diplomatic career
Yoshida's diplomatic career began with a posting in China, first at the Japanese mission in Tianjin in November 1906, then in Fengtian (now Shenyang) in 1907. In 1909, he was assigned to Italy, and in 1912, he was posted to Andong in Japanese-ruled Korea. In 1916, he was assigned to the Japanese embassy in the United States, and in 1918 he was assigned to Jinan, China. In 1919, he was a member of the Japanese legation at the Paris Peace Conference. In 1920, he was named first secretary to the Japanese embassy in the United Kingdom. In 1922, he returned to China and served in Tianjin until 1925, then in Fengtian until 1928.

In 1928, he briefly served as minister to Sweden, Norway, and Denmark before being appointed deputy foreign minister that same year, serving until 1930. In 1930, after the army vetoed his appointment as foreign minister, he was appointed ambassador to Italy, and in 1936, he became ambassador to the United Kingdom, serving until 1938. During the 1930s, he supported increasing Japanese influence in China, and advocated for the independence of Manchuria and Mongolia to weaken the Republic of China. After his ambassadorship to the United Kingdom ended in 1938, he retired from the diplomatic service.

During World War II

Although considered a "hawk" on China, Yoshida was firmly against war with the United States and United Kingdom. Despite holding no official positions during World War II, he was active in trying to prevent war with the Allies, and then to try to bring about an early end of the war, allying himself with Prince Fumimaro Konoe.

Right before the Pacific War began, Yoshida joined Konoe in unsuccessfully attempting to deescalate the situation. During the war, Yoshida continued to associate with Konoe in trying to get the government to negotiate a peace with the Allies. In April 1945, he was arrested and briefly imprisoned over his association with Prince Konoe.

Prime ministership

Following the Japanese surrender in August 1945, the Allied occupation of the country began. In November 1945, the new Liberal Party was formed, and Yoshida joined it. The 1946 general election brought the Liberal Party to power. Its leader, Ichirō Hatoyama, became prime minister, but Hatoyama was purged by the Allied occupation authorities soon afterwards, and Yoshida was appointed in his stead, becoming the 45th prime minister of Japan on 22 May 1946. His pro-American and pro-British ideals and his knowledge of Western societies, gained through education and political work abroad, are what made him the perfect candidate in the eyes of the occupation authorities.

After being replaced with Tetsu Katayama on 24 May 1947, he returned to the post as the 48th prime minister on 15 October 1948. In 1951, he signed the Treaty of San Francisco, a peace treaty with the Allies that would serve as a formal peace agreement and bring about the end of the occupation of Japan in 1952. During a stopover in Hawaii on the way back from San Francisco, he also paid a visit to Pearl Harbor.

Under Yoshida's leadership, Japan began to rebuild its lost industrial infrastructure and placed a premium on unrestrained economic growth. Many of these concepts still impact Japan's political and economic policies. However, since the 1970s environmental movement, the bursting of Japan's economic bubble, and the end of the Cold War, Japan has been struggling to redefine its national goals.

He was retained in three succeeding elections (49th: 16 February 1949; 50th: 30 October 1952; and 51st: 21 May 1953).

According to CIA files that were declassified in 2005, there was a 1952 plot to assassinate Yoshida and replace him with Ichirō Hatoyama as prime minister. The plot was led by Takushiro Hattori, who served as an Imperial Japanese Army officer, and had the support of 500,000 Japanese.

Dissatisfaction with his leadership led to the defection of many Diet members from his party to the new Democratic Party, causing his cabinet to resign on December 7, 1954, rather than face a no-confidence vote. He was replaced by Ichirō Hatoyama. on December 10, 1954. Yoshida remained in the Diet until his retirement in 1963.

The Yoshida Doctrine

The Yoshida Doctrine was a strategy adopted by Japan under Yoshida starting in 1951. He concentrated upon reconstructing Japan's domestic economy while relying heavily on the security alliance with the United States. First, Japan is firmly allied with the United States in the Cold War against communism. Second, Japan relies on American military strength and limits its own defense forces to a minimum. Third, Japan emphasizes economic diplomacy in its world affairs. The Yoshida doctrine was accepted by the United States; the actual term was coined in 1977. The economic dimension was fostered by Hayato Ikeda who served as his finance minister and later was prime minister. The Yoshida Doctrine shaped Japanese foreign policy into the 21st century. Most historians argue the policy was wise and successful, but a minority criticize it as naïve and inappropriate.

Later years

Yoshida later became president of the Japanese Association of Zoos and Aquariums.

He died in 1967. He was baptized on his deathbed, having hidden his Catholicism throughout most of his life. His funeral was held in St. Mary's Cathedral, Tokyo and buried at Aoyama Cemetery.

Personal life
In 1909, Yoshida married Makino Yukiko, the eldest daughter of Makino Nobuaki. They had four children: Sakurako, Kenichi, Kazuko, and Masao. Two of Yoshida's grandchildren are Tarō Asō, who served as the 92nd prime minister of Japan from 2008 to 2009, and Nobuko Asō, who later married Prince Tomohito of Mikasa, a first cousin of Emperor Akihito.

Honours

Grand Cordon of the Order of the Rising Sun (29 April 1940)
Grand Cordon of the Order of the Chrysanthemum (29 April 1964)
Collar of the Order of the Chrysanthemum (20 October 1967; posthumous)
Junior First Rank (20 October 1967; posthumous)
Golden Pheasant Award of the Scout Association of Japan (1967)

Selected works
Yoshida's published writings encompass 159 works in 307 publications in 6 languages; His work can be found in the collections of 5,754 libraries worldwide (as of 5 June 2001).

The most widely held works by Yoshida include:

 The Yoshida Memoirs: the Story of Japan in Crisis; 15 editions published between 1957 and 1983 in English and Japanese and held by 875 libraries worldwide.
 Japan's Decisive Century, 1867–1967; 1 edition published in 1967 in English and held by 650 libraries worldwide.
 Yoshida Shigeru: Last Meiji Man; 2 editions published in 2007 in English and held by 286 libraries worldwide.
 日本を決定した百年; 7 editions published between 1967 and 2006 in 3 languages and held by 46 libraries worldwide.
 大磯隨想; 5 editions published between 1962 and 1991 in Japanese and held by 34 libraries worldwide.
 吉田茂書翰; 2 editions published in 1994 in Japanese and held by 31 libraries worldwide.
 世界と日本; 3 editions published between 1963 and 1992 in Japanese and held by 26 libraries worldwide.
 Japan im Wiederaufstieg; die Yoshida Memoiren ; 1 edition published in 1963 in German and held by 9 libraries worldwide.

Notes

References
 Rodan, Garry, Hewison, Kevin and Robison, Richard. (1997). The Political Economy of South-East Asia: An Introduction. Melbourne: Oxford University Press. ;  OCLC 464661946
 McGrew, Anthony and Christopher Book. (1998) Asia-Pacific in the New World Order. London: Routledge. ; ;  OCLC 60184921
 Shigeru Yoshida and Hiroshi Nara. (2007). Shigeru: Last Meiji Man. Lanham, Maryland: Rowman & Littlefield.   ;  OCLC 238440967

Further reading
 Dower, John W. Empire and Aftermath: Yoshida Shigeru and the Japanese Experience, 1878–1954. 
 Edström, Bert. Yoshida Shigeru and the Foundation of Japan's Postwar Foreign Policy. Finn, Richard B. Winners in peace: MacArthur, Yoshida, and Postwar Japan. Takashi Hirose (広瀬隆); 『私物国家 日本の黒幕の系図』 Tokyo:Kobunsha (1997) Genealogy14
 Iriye, Akira. "Japan Returns to the World: Yoshida Shigeru and His Legacy." The Diplomats, 1939-1979'' (Princeton University Press, 2019) pp. 321–336. online

External links
 
 
 OSS Biographical Report on Yoshida dated January 1945

|-

|-

|-

1878 births
1967 deaths
20th-century prime ministers of Japan
Ambassadors of Japan to Italy
Ambassadors of Japan to the United Kingdom
Foreign ministers of Japan
Honorary Knights Commander of the Royal Victorian Order
Japanese anti-communists
Japanese prisoners and detainees
Japanese Roman Catholics
Liberal Democratic Party (Japan) politicians
Democratic Liberal Party (Japan) politicians
Liberal Party (Japan, 1945) politicians
Members of the House of Peers (Japan)
Members of the House of Representatives (Japan)
Prime Ministers of Japan
People from Kōchi Prefecture
People from Yokosuka, Kanagawa
People of the Korean War
Politicians from Tokyo
Prisoners and detainees of Japan
University of Tokyo alumni